Hornbeam Park is a railway station on the Harrogate Line, which runs between  and  via . It is owned by Network Rail and managed by Northern Trains.

Facilities
Access to both platforms is step-free, and although the station is unstaffed (so ticket must be purchased on the train), ramps are available for access to the trains from the platforms. The station has basic shelters on each platform (which are offset from each other) and train running details are provided via automatic announcements, timetable posters and CIS displays.

Services

As of the May 2021 timetable change, the station is served by two trains per hour between Leeds and Knaresborough, with one train per hour extending to York. Additional services operate at peak times. During the evening and on Sunday, an hourly service operates between Leeds and York. All services are operated by Northern Trains.

Rolling stock used: Class 158 Express Sprinter and Class 170 Turbostar

References

External links
 
 

Railway stations in Harrogate
DfT Category F1 stations
Railway stations opened by British Rail
Railway stations in Great Britain opened in 1992
Northern franchise railway stations